Detlef Pirsig (22 October 1945 – 9 December 2019) was a German football player and manager. He played in 385 matches, primarily with MSV Duisburg.

Pirsig died on 9 December 2019 at the age of 74.

References

External links
 

1945 births
2019 deaths
German footballers
MSV Duisburg players
German football managers
Wuppertaler SV managers
MSV Duisburg managers
Schwarz-Weiß Essen managers
Bundesliga players
2. Bundesliga players
Association football defenders
FC Wegberg-Beeck managers
People from Schwerin